Doyer is a surname. Notable people with the surname include:

Theo Doyer (1955–2010), Dutch hockey player
Danielle Doyer (born 1951), French-Canadian politician and teacher
Jacobus Schoemaker Doyer (1792–1867), Dutch painter

See also
Boyer
Dover (surname)